John Nicholl may refer to:

 John Nicholl (mariner) (fl. 1605–1637?), English mariner and author
 Sir John Nicholl (1759–1838), Welsh MP for Penryn and judge
 John Nicholl (antiquary) (1790-1871), English antiquary
 John Iltyd Nicholl (1797–1853), Welsh MP for Cardiff and judge

See also
 John Nichol (disambiguation)
 John Nicholls (disambiguation)